Acanthopleura gemmata, the jewelled chiton, is a species of chiton.

Description
This large species of chiton grows to be about 7 cm (3 inches) in length. It has oval shaped body with dimpled plate margins, a brown girdle with eight overlapping plates, long calcareous spicules and dark bands.

Distribution
This chiton has an Indo-Pacific distribution.

Habitat
This species lives in the littoral zone of coral reefs on the rocks and cliffs.

References
Richmond, M. (Ed.) (1997). A guide to the seashores of Eastern Africa and the Western Indian Ocean islands. Department for Research Cooperation, SAREC/Sida: Stockholm
WoRMS
Encyclopaedia of Life
Great Barrier Reef
M.ala.org.au

Chitonidae
Chitons described in 1825